Gerhard Prautzsch (born September 25, 1941) is a German former footballer and coach.

References

1941 births
Living people
People from Rochlitz
East German footballers
East German football managers
Dynamo Dresden players
Dynamo Dresden managers
DDR-Oberliga players
Association football defenders
Footballers from Saxony